Anauxesis cincticornis is a species of beetle in the family Cerambycidae. It was described by Francis Polkinghorne Pascoe in 1857.

References

Agapanthiini
Beetles described in 1857
Taxa named by Francis Polkinghorne Pascoe